Strategic and Competitive Intelligence Professionals (SCIP), formerly the Society of Competitive Intelligence Professionals, is a global non-profit best practice sharing community for experts from industry, academia, government, and non-profits in Strategic Intelligence: competitive intelligence, market intelligence, market research, strategic analysis, business intelligence, and strategy. SCIP is one of the only global membership organizations in the field of competitive intelligence (CI) and business strategy and organizes an annual international meeting and exposition. The last (2019) annual meeting was held in Orlando, Florida, US, and the 2020 Conference will be held May 11-13, 2020 outside Chicago, Illinois. It is called SCIP IntelliCon 2020.

SCIP is governed by a member-elected board of directors, who serve three-year terms. It also has a virtual staff of approximately five association professionals, led by a executive director, currently Cam Mackey. In 2019, SCIP started partnering with association management company Ewald Consulting in the areas of event management and marketing, membership, and sponsorships. 

The organization hosts a CI career board on its web site, supports volunteer projects and Council groups, as well as releases Competitive Intelligence Magazine (quarterly, online publication), SCIP.insight (a monthly free newsletter), and monthly decision support deliverables. Also, SCIP produces various whitepapers and industry reports and grants industry certifications and CEUs. SCIP provides access to expert presentations and webinars on its website as well.

SCIP has chapters in the United States as well as in 16 other countries.

SCIP has held annual conferences for almost thirty years, as well as European summit meetings for almost twenty. While it did not hold a European Summit in 2018 or 2019, it will do so in 2020.

Historical development
Strategic and Competitive Intelligence Professionals, SCIP, was founded in 1986 in the Washington, D.C., area through the efforts of a number of local and national intelligence practitioners. The earliest members of the association derived from the corporate community, academe, and public sector. It was headquartered in Alexandria, Virginia until 2012. In December 2005, through the efforts of Dr. Craig Fleisher and the Society's then Executive Director Alexander Graham, SCIP founded the Competitive Intelligence Foundation (CIF). The CI Foundation conducts and supports research on emerging issues and key trends that affect the practice of competitive intelligence and its ability to support key decision-makers and their organizations. The CI Foundation also makes existing and developing competitive intelligence knowledge visible, available, and relevant to the competitive intelligence practitioner through targeted publications including handbooks, studies, and survey reports.

The financial crisis of 2007–2008 took a big toll on SCIP, which found itself without sufficient financial reserves. According to board member Jens Thieme, "SCIP's thin balance sheet was threatened to the extend to shut down within months." As a consequence, in 2009 the SCIP merged with the Frost & Sullivan Institute. That same year, the Annual SCIP event was merged with Frost & Sullivan's annual Competitive Intelligence event. Until 2019, Frost & Sullivan provided event management services to SCIP. 

On July 8, 2010 the SCIP board of directors voted to officially change the organization's name from "Society of Competitive Intelligence Professionals" to "Strategic and Competitive Intelligence Professionals". According to SCIP, this modification reflects the developing evolution of the competitive intelligence (CI) profession to support executive decision-making and firmly acknowledges the relationship between competitive intelligence and strategy.

References

External links
scip.org Strategic and Competitive Intelligence Professionals
http://www.scip.org/cifoundation/ Competitive Intelligence Foundation

International professional associations
Organizations established in 1986